Three Hill Creek is a stream in St. Francois and Washington counties in the U.S. state of Missouri. It is a tributary of Big River.

The stream flows to the north-northeast crossing into St. Francois County and under Missouri Route 47 roughly two miles north of the source.

Three Hill Creek was so named on account of three hills near its headwaters.

See also
List of rivers of Missouri

References

Rivers of St. Francois County, Missouri
Rivers of Washington County, Missouri
Rivers of Missouri